Colonel Hugh Anthony Johnstone  was the administrative head of SIGINT (Signals Intelligence) in the British Army during the 1970s.

He became known when he was identified by the magazines Peace News and The Leveller as the much-publicised anonymous witness Colonel B in the ABC Trial in 1978.

Johnstone was commissioned into the Royal Corps of Signals from Sandhurst in 1952. He was promoted to lieutenant in 1954, captain in 1958, major in 1965, lieutenant-colonel in 1970, and colonel in 1975. He retired in 1979.

See also
 Government Communications Headquarters (GCHQ)
 Duncan Campbell

References
  Attorney-General vs The Leveller & Others, British House of Lords hearings, 1 Feb 1979.  
 Geoffrey Robertson, The Justice Game, Vintage, London, 1999, pp. 104–134

Royal Corps of Signals officers
Officers of the Order of the British Empire
Graduates of the Royal Military Academy Sandhurst
Year of birth missing
Possibly living people
20th-century British Army personnel